Line SFMB is a commuter rail line that is part of the Turin Metropolitan Railway Service, and links Cavallermaggiore to Bra.

References

Turin Metropolitan Railway Service
Railway lines opened in 2013